Major-General Alexander Patrick Drummond Telfer-Smollett  (12 August 1884 – 1954) was a British Army officer who became Lieutenant Governor of Guernsey.

Military career
Telfer-Smollett entered and later graduated from the Royal Military College, Sandhurst, from where he was commissioned into the Highland Light Infantry in 1904. After serving in World War I, during which he was awarded the Military Cross, and ultimately leading his regiment to victory at the Battle of Cambrai in 1918, he was awarded the Distinguished Service Order in 1919, and then saw service with the North Russia Relief Force in the Russian Civil War.

Remaining in the army during the interwar period, "Alec" Telfer-Smollett, by now a brevet lieutenant colonel, attended the Staff College, Camberley from 1920 to 1921, and then served at the War Office from 1925 to 1929, which was followed by being a Senior Staff Officer to the Inspector-General of the West African Frontier Force until 1930. 1931 to 1934 saw him as commanding officer (CO) of the 1st Battalion, Highland Light Infantry and then commander of the 157th (Highland Light Infantry) Brigade until 1935. 

He was appointed Commanding Officer of the British Troops in Shanghai in 1936. He intervened in the Defense of Sihang Warehouse in 1937 during the Second Sino-Japanese War and facilitated the Chinese withdrawal. He went on to be Lieutenant Governor of Guernsey in 1939 and to serve as a District Commander in the UK during World War II from 1940, the year where his son was killed in action, until his retirement in 1942.

He lived at Cameron House near Luss in Scotland and in retirement he became Lord Lieutenant of Dunbartonshire. He was also Colonel of the Highland Light Infantry.

References

Bibliography

External links
Generals of World War II

|-

1884 births
1954 deaths
British Army major generals
British Army personnel of World War I
British Army generals of World War II
Graduates of the Royal Military College, Sandhurst
British Army personnel of the Russian Civil War
Graduates of the Staff College, Camberley
Companions of the Order of the Bath
Commanders of the Order of the British Empire
Companions of the Distinguished Service Order
Recipients of the Military Cross
Highland Light Infantry officers
Lord-Lieutenants of Dunbartonshire